Châteauvieux may refer to the following places in France:

 Châteauvieux, Hautes-Alpes, a commune in the department of Hautes-Alpes
 Châteauvieux, Loir-et-Cher, a commune in the department of Loir-et-Cher
 Châteauvieux, Var, a commune in the department of Var
 Châteauvieux-les-Fossés, a commune in the department of Doubs

People with the name Châteauvieux:
 Michel Lullin de Chateauvieux (1695-1781), Swiss author and experimenter on agriculture
 Michel Lullin de Chateauvieux (1754 - 1802), Swiss agronom, and grandson of Michel Lullin de Chateauvieux (1695-1781)
 Armand-François Chateauvieux (1770–?), dramatist and playwright